Charles Ezra Sprague (October 9, 1842 – March 21, 1912) was an American accountant, born in Nassau, Rensselaer County, New York. He was a proponent of the constructed language Volapük, for which he authored the first major textbook in English, Handbook of Volapük (1888), as well as an early organizer of the accounting profession.

During the American Civil War, Sprague served in the 44th New York Infantry, seeing action at the Battle of Gettysburg, where his unit was instrumental in helping repulse attacks on Little Round Top. The New York State Archives stores a lengthy article Sprague wrote on his military service.

He was president of both the New York Institute of Accounts and the Union Dime Savings Bank (which later became the Dime Savings Bank). Later in life, he was involved in the movement for reform of English spelling as part of the Simplified Spelling Board, of which he was the first treasurer.

He was heavily involved in the development of the first state certification of accountants in the United States.

In 1953 he was inducted into Ohio State University's Accounting Hall of Fame.

Sprague was the maternal grandfather of science fiction author L. Sprague de Camp.

Notes

References
Miranti, Paul J. "Birth of a Profession". The CPA Journal. (1996).  On-line version retrieved on 4 January 2008.
Rogers, Rodney K. "Sprague, Charles Ezra [1842-1912". History of Accounting: An International Encyclopedia. New York: Garland, 1996. pp. 548–550. On-line version retrieved on 20 July 2011.

External links

 Civil War service and biography
 
 
 Sprague's Handbook of Volapük 
 Biography at OSU's Accounting Hall of Fame site 

1842 births
1912 deaths
American bankers
People of New York (state) in the American Civil War
Union Army soldiers
People from Rensselaer County, New York
Volapük
Volapükologists
19th-century American businesspeople